Mitochondrial 2-oxoglutarate/malate carrier protein is a protein that in humans is encoded by the SLC25A11 gene. Inactivating mutations in this gene predispose to metastasic paraganglioma.

See also
 Solute carrier family

References

Further reading

Solute carrier family